The Mediterranean diet is a diet inspired by the eating habits and traditional food of people who live near the Mediterranean Basin. This differentiates it from Mediterranean cuisine, which occurs naturally in Mediterranean countries and is inherent to them. While inspired by a specific time and place, the "Mediterranean diet" was later proven and refined based on the results of multiple scientific studies.

The principal aspects of this diet include proportionally high consumption of unprocessed cereals, legumes, olive oil, fruits, and vegetables, and moderate consumption of fish, dairy products (mostly cheese and yogurt), and meat products. Olive oil has been studied as a potential health factor for reducing all-cause mortality and the risk of chronic diseases.

The Mediterranean diet is associated with a reduction in all-cause mortality in observational studies. There is evidence that the Mediterranean diet lowers the risk of heart disease and early death. On March 14, 2023, medical researchers reported a significant 24% reduction of heart disease risk in women on a Mediterranean-type diet. The American Heart Association and American Diabetes Association recommend the Mediterranean diet as a healthy dietary pattern that may reduce the risk of cardiovascular diseases and type 2 diabetes, respectively. The Mediterranean diet may help with weight loss in obese people. The Mediterranean diet is one of three healthy diets recommended in the 2015–2020 Dietary Guidelines for Americans, along with the DASH diet and vegetarian diet. The Mediterranean and DASH diets are two of the main sources for the MIND diet recommendations.

The Mediterranean diet as a nutritional recommendation is different from the cultural practices that UNESCO listed in 2010 under the heading "Mediterranean diet" on the Representative List of the Intangible Cultural Heritage of Humanity: "a set of skills, knowledge, rituals, symbols and traditions concerning crops, harvesting, fishing, animal husbandry, conservation, processing, cooking, and particularly the sharing and consumption of food", not as a particular set of foods. (See Mediterranean cuisine.) Its sponsors include Cyprus, Croatia, Spain, Greece, Italy, Morocco,  and Portugal.

Health effects

A 2017 review found evidence that practice of a Mediterranean diet could lead to a decreased risk of cardiovascular diseases, overall cancer incidence, neurodegenerative diseases, diabetes, and early death. A 2018 review showed that practice of the Mediterranean diet may improve overall health status, such as reduced risk of non-communicable diseases, reduced total costs of living, and reduced costs for national healthcare. A 2016 review found similar weight loss as other diets. A 2019 Cochrane review found that there is still uncertainty regarding the effects of Mediterranean‐style diet advice on cardiovascular disease occurrence and risk factors in people both with and without cardiovascular disease already.

The US 2015–2020 national guidelines devised a "Healthy Mediterranean-Style Eating Pattern", assessed against and mirroring the Mediterranean diet patterns and its positive health outcomes. It was designed from the "Healthy U.S.-Style Eating Pattern", but it contains more fruits and seafood, and less dairy. In the 2020s, research on the Mediterranean diet indicates that a Mediterranean diet may contribute to health.

Cardiovascular disease
The Mediterranean diet is included among dietary patterns that may reduce the risk of cardiovascular diseases. A 2013 Cochrane review found limited evidence that a Mediterranean diet favorably affects cardiovascular risk factors.  A 2013 meta-analysis compared Mediterranean, vegan, vegetarian, low-glycemic index, low-carbohydrate, high-fiber, and high-protein diets with control diets. The research concluded that Mediterranean, low-carbohydrate, low-glycemic index, and high-protein diets are effective in improving markers of risk for cardiovascular disease and diabetes, while there was limited evidence for an effect of vegetarian diets on glycemic control and lipid levels unrelated to weight loss. However, more cautious reviews arose in early 2016, raising concerns about the quality of previous systematic reviews examining the impact of a Mediterranean diet on cardiovascular risk factors. These reviews insisted upon the need for further standardized research, stating that the evidence for possible prevention of cardiovascular disease by the diet was "limited and highly variable". Reviews in 2016-17 reached similar conclusions about the ability of a Mediterranean diet to improve cardiovascular risk factors, such as lowering the risk for hypertension and other cardiovascular diseases.

The Mediterranean diet is low in saturated fat with high amounts of monounsaturated fat and dietary fiber. One possible factor is the potential health effects of olive oil in the Mediterranean diet. Olive oil contains monounsaturated fats, most notably oleic acid, which is under clinical research for its potential health benefits. The European Food Safety Authority Panel on Dietetic Products, Nutrition and Allergies approved health claims on olive oil, for protection by its polyphenols against oxidation of blood lipids and for the contribution to the maintenance of normal blood LDL-cholesterol levels by replacing saturated fats in the diet with oleic acid (Commission Regulation (EU) 432/2012 of 16 May 2012). A 2014 meta-analysis concluded that an elevated consumption of olive oil is associated with reduced risk of all-cause mortality, cardiovascular events and stroke, while monounsaturated fatty acids of mixed animal and plant origin showed no significant effects. The American Heart Association discussed the Mediterranean diet as a healthy dietary pattern that may reduce the risk of cardiovascular diseases.

Diabetes
In 2014, two meta-analyses found that the Mediterranean diet was associated with a decreased risk of type 2 diabetes, findings similar to those of a 2017 review. The American Diabetes Association and a 2019 review indicated that the Mediterranean diet is a healthy dietary pattern that may reduce the risk of diabetes.

Cancer
A meta-analysis in 2008 found that strictly following the Mediterranean diet was correlated with a decreased risk of dying from cancer by 6%. Another 2014 review found that adherence to the Mediterranean diet was associated with a decreased risk of death from cancer. A 2017 review found a decreased rate of cancer, though evidence was weak. An updated review in 2021 found that the Mediterranean diet is associated with a 13% lower risk of cancer mortality in the general population.

Weight loss in obesity
Overweight adults who adopt Mediterranean diets may lose weight by consuming fewer calories.
A 2019 review found that the Mediterranean diet may help obese people lower the quantity and improve the nutritional quality of food intake, with an overall effect of possibly losing body weight.

Cognitive ability
A 2016 systematic review found a relation between greater adherence to a Mediterranean diet and better cognitive performance; it is unclear if the relationship is causal.

According to a 2013 systematic review, greater adherence to a Mediterranean diet is correlated with a lower risk of Alzheimer's disease and slower cognitive decline. Another 2013 systematic review reached similar conclusions, and also found a negative association with the risk of progressing from mild cognitive impairment to Alzheimer's, but acknowledged that only a small number of studies had been done on the topic.

Major depressive disorder
There is a correlation between adherence to the Mediterranean diet and a lower risk of depression.  Studies on which these correlations are made are observational and do not prove cause and effect.

Gluten
As the Mediterranean diet usually includes products containing gluten like pasta and bread, increasing use of the diet may have contributed to the growing rate of gluten-related disorders.

Dietary components

There are variations of the "Mediterranean diets" in different countries and among the individual populations of the Mediterranean basin, due to ethnic, cultural, economic and religious diversities. The "Mediterranean diet" as defined by dietitians generally includes the following components, which are not typical of diets in the Mediterranean Basin:
 High intakes of olive oil (as the principal source of fat), vegetables (including leafy green vegetables, onions, garlic, tomatoes, and peppers), fresh fruits (consumed as desserts or snacks), cereals (mostly whole grains), nuts, and legumes.
 Moderate intakes of fish and other seafood, poultry, eggs, dairy products (principally cheese and yogurt), and red wine.
 Low intakes of red meat, processed meat, refined carbohydrates, and sweets.

These proportions are sometimes represented in the Mediterranean Diet Pyramid. In a diet with roughly this composition, the fat content accounts for 25% to 35% of the total intake of calories, while the amount of saturated fat is, at most, 8% of the calorie content.

In contrast to the dietary recommendation, olive oil is not the staple fat in much of the Mediterranean basin: in northern and central Italy, lard and butter are commonly used in cooking, and olive oil is reserved for dressing salads and cooked vegetables; in both North Africa and the Middle East, sheep's tail fat and rendered butter (samna) are traditional staple fats.

Environmental effects

Consuming a Mediterranean diet or plant-based diet may contribute to improving environmental and agricultural sustainability, possibly due to lower use of dairy products, ruminant meat, and processed foods. The environmental impact and amount of energy needed to feed livestock exceeds its nutritional value. In a 2014 lifecycle analysis of greenhouse gas emissions, researchers found that a Mediterranean-like diet may reduce food production emissions below those of an omnivorous diet for 2050, with a per capita reduction of 30%.

History and reception
The concept of Mediterranean diet was first publicized in 1975 by the American biologist Ancel Keys and chemist Margaret Keys (a husband and wife team), but failed to gain widespread recognition until the 1990s.

Objective data showing that the Mediterranean diet is healthy originated from results of epidemiological studies in Calabria, Naples and Madrid, confirmed later by the Seven Countries Study first published in 1970, and a book-length report in 1980.

The most commonly understood version of the Mediterranean diet was presented by, among others, Walter Willett and colleagues of the Harvard University School of Public Health since the mid-1990s. The Mediterranean diet is based on a paradox: although the people living in Mediterranean countries tend to consume relatively high amounts of fat, they have far lower rates of cardiovascular disease than in countries like the United States where similar levels of fat consumption are found. A parallel phenomenon is known as the French paradox. By 2011, the Mediterranean diet was included by some authors as a fad diet promoted for losing weight. As of 2018, the value of the traditional Mediterranean diet was questioned due to homogenization of dietary choices and food products in the global economy, yet clinical research activity remained high, with favorable outcomes reported for various disease conditions, such as metabolic syndrome.

See also

 Cretan diet
 Cuisine of the Mediterranean
 List of diets
 Mediterranean Diet Foundation
 Health effects of wine
 Sustainable diet
 Ikaria Study

References

External links 
 

Diets
Intangible Cultural Heritage of Humanity
Sustainable food system